Damian Thompson (born 1962) is an English journalist, editor and author. He is an associate editor of The Spectator. Previously he worked as editor-in-chief of the Catholic Herald and for The Daily Telegraph where he was religious affairs correspondent and later blogs editor and a Saturday columnist.

Career
Thompson was educated at Presentation College, Reading (later known as the Elvian School), and read history at Mansfield College, Oxford.

In 2003, he received his Ph.D in the sociology of religion from the London School of Economics for his thesis, The problem of the end: a sociological study of the management of apocalyptic belief at Kensington Temple, a London Pentecostal church, at the end of the millennium. He was religious affairs correspondent of The Daily Telegraph from 1990 to 1994, and subsequently editor-in chief of the Catholic Herald. He is a director of the Herald.

Thompson was a Saturday columnist for The Daily Telegraph from 2011, and the Blogs Editor of the Telegraph Media Group, with responsibility for editing and commissioning blogs on politics, religion, finance and culture. In June 2014, he left his posts at The Telegraph "in entirely amicable circumstances". On 5 August 2014, The Spectator announced that Thompson had been appointed associate editor.

He has written two books about apocalyptic belief and one about conspiracy theories or "counterknowledge", which he describes as "misinformation packaged to look like fact". His book The Fix: How Addiction is Invading our Lives and Taking Over Your World was published in 2012. He writes a monthly column about classical music for The Spectator.

Books
The End of Time: Faith and the Fear in the Shadow of the Millennium (University Press of New England, 1997); 
Loose Canon: A Portrait of Brian Brindley (ed) (Continuum, 2004); 
Waiting for Antichrist: Charisma and Apocalypse in a Pentecostal Church (Oxford University Press, 2005); 
Counterknowledge: How We Surrendered to Conspiracy Theories, Quack Medicine, Bogus Science and Fake History (Atlantic Books, 2008); 
The Fix: How Addiction is Invading our Lives and Taking Over Your World (Collins, 2012);

References

External links 
Damian Thompson – The Telegraph
Damian Thompson – The Spectator

1962 births
Living people
Alumni of Mansfield College, Oxford
Alumni of the London School of Economics
The Daily Telegraph people
Editors of Catholic publications
English bloggers
English political writers
English journalists
English Roman Catholics
Online journalists
People educated at Elvian School
Place of birth missing (living people)
Religion journalists
British male bloggers